Khemis Sahel is a town in Larache Province, Tanger-Tetouan-Al Hoceima, Morocco. According to the 2004 census it has a population of 107,371.

References

Populated places in Larache Province